"You Wouldn't Know Love" is a song written by Michael Bolton and Diane Warren appearing in 1989 on Bolton's Soul Provider album and Cher's Heart of Stone album. The song was only released as a single in Europe and Australasia by Cher in 1990. Cher's version of the song was produced by Bolton. It was a minor success in the UK, faring better in Ireland. Michael Landau played the guitar solo in the middle of the song on both Cher and Bolton’s versions of the song.

Critical reception
The Daily Vault's Mark Millan stated, "Another gem on the record is the rocker "You Wouldn't Know Love" that keeps the momentum running superbly." David Giles from Music Week wrote that it "is a lot more steadfastly MOR and what you'd expect considering that Michael Bolton co-wrote and produced it. Probably a substantial hit."

Charts

Track listing
European 7" single
"You Wouldn't Know Love" – 3:28
"Kiss to Kiss" – 4:22

European 12" and CD single
"You Wouldn't Know Love"
"Kiss to Kiss"
"Bang-Bang"
"Heart of Stone" (Remix)

UK limited 7" EP
"You Wouldn't Know Love"
"If I Could Turn Back Time" (Remix)
"I Found Someone"
"We All Sleep Alone" (Remix)

Personnel
Vocals: Cher
Drums: John Keane
Bass: Neil Stubenhaus
Keyboards: Phillip Ashley
Guitars: Mike Landau

Michael Bolton version
Bolton's own version appeared on his album, Soul Provider, which peaked at number 3 on the Billboard albums chart. The album was certified 6× Platinum by the RIAA in 1994.

Personnel
Michael Bolton: vocals
Kyf Brewer, Joe Cerisano, Desmond Child, Patricia Darcy, John Fiore, Kate McGunnigle, Lou Merlino, Myriam Naomi Valle:  backing vocals
Michael Landau: guitars
Walter Afanasieff: keyboards, percussion
Michael Omartian: keyboards, drums, percussion
Gregg Mangiafico: keyboards
Eric Rehl: synthesizers
Hugh McDonald: bass guitar
Bobby Chouinard: drums

References

External links
Official Cher site

1990 singles
Michael Bolton songs
Cher songs
Songs written by Diane Warren
Songs written by Michael Bolton
1989 songs
Geffen Records singles